Leonte is both a given name and a surname. Notable people with the name include:

Leonte Filipescu, Romanian communist
Leonte Moldovan
Leonte Răutu
Leonte Tismăneanu, Romanian communist activist and propagandist
Gheorghe Leonte, Romanian rugby union footballer

Romanian masculine given names